Jiří Zídek Sr. (8 February 1944 – 21 May 2022) was a Czech professional basketball player and coach. He was named the Best Czech Player of the 20th Century. He was also among the 105 nominees to the 50 Greatest EuroLeague Contributors list. His son, Jiří "George" Zídek Jr., also won the EuroLeague title with Žalgiris, in 1999. To this day, they are the only father and son to have reached a EuroLeague title game as players. In 2019, he became the first Czech to be inducted into the FIBA Hall of Fame.

Playing career

Club career
Zídek helped Slavia Prague make it all the way to the EuroLeague's Final in the 1965–66 season. He scored 22 points in the final, to lead all scorers, but Simmenthal Milano stood in his way for the EuroLeague crown, winning the game by a score of 77–72. Zídek also helped Slavia reach the 1966–67 EuroLeague semifinals, and win the 1968–69 Final of the European-wide secondary level FIBA European Cup Winners' Cup (FIBA Saporta Cup). He also starred for Slavia in front of 80,000 fans, in Athens, at the 1967–68 FIBA Saporta Cup Final, against AEK Athens – which was one of the biggest crowds in basketball history.

National team career
Zídek helped to lead the senior men's Czechoslovak national team to a silver medal at the 1967 EuroBasket, where he was voted to the All-Tournament Team. He averaged 13.8 points per game in the tournament. His best game of that tournament was the final, which was lost against the Soviet Union national team, by a score of 89–77, in which he scored 23 points. He was also the leader of the Czechoslovak national team, when they won the bronze medal at the 1969 EuroBasket, where he averaged 12.6 points per game.

He also competed in the men's tournament at the 1972 Summer Olympics.

Coaching career
After his playing career, Zídek worked as a basketball coach.

See also
Czechoslovak Basketball League career stats leaders

References

External links
 FIBA Profile
 FIBA Europe Profile
 Player nominees for the Euroleague's 50 Greatest Contributors

1944 births
2022 deaths
Basketball players at the 1972 Summer Olympics
Centers (basketball)
Czech basketball coaches
Czech men's basketball players
Czechoslovak basketball coaches
Czechoslovak men's basketball players
1970 FIBA World Championship players
1974 FIBA World Championship players
FIBA Hall of Fame inductees
Olympic basketball players of Czechoslovakia
USK Praha players
Sportspeople from Prague